The Texas 7 were a group of prisoners who escaped from the John B. Connally Unit near Kenedy, Texas, on December 13, 2000. Six of the seven were apprehended over a month later, between January 21–23, 2001, as a direct result of the television show America's Most Wanted. The seventh committed suicide before he could be arrested. The six surviving members were all convicted and sentenced to death for the murder of Irving, Texas police officer Aubrey Wright Hawkins, who was shot and killed when responding to a robbery perpetrated by the Texas Seven. Four of the six sentenced have since been executed.

Members 
The group included the following Texas state prisoners:
 Joseph Christopher Garcia (November 6, 1971, in San Antonio, Texas – December 4, 2018, in Huntsville, Texas), executed.
 Garcia was originally convicted of murder for killing a man during a drunken altercation.
 Randy Ethan Halprin (born September 13, 1977, in McKinney, Texas), on Texas Death Row awaiting execution.
 Halprin was originally convicted for child abuse after "[breaking] a 16-month-old's arms and legs, fracturing his skull and beating his face until one eye filled with blood."
 Larry James Harper (September 10, 1963, in Danville, Illinois – January 22, 2001, in Woodland Park, Colorado), committed suicide before he could be captured by law enforcement.
 Harper was originally convicted of aggravated sexual assault.
 Patrick Henry Murphy Jr. (born October 3, 1961, in Dallas, Texas), on Texas Death Row awaiting execution.
 Murphy was originally convicted for aggravated sexual assault after "breaking into a woman's home and sexually assaulting her at knifepoint."
 Donald Keith Newbury (May 18, 1962, in Albuquerque, New Mexico – February 4, 2015, in Huntsville, Texas), executed.
 Newbury was originally convicted for aggravated robbery with a deadly weapon.
 George Angel Rivas Jr. (May 6, 1970, in El Paso, Texas – February 29, 2012, in Huntsville, Texas), executed.
 Rivas was originally convicted of robbery.
 Michael Anthony Rodriguez (October 29, 1962, in San Antonio, Texas – August 14, 2008, in Huntsville, Texas), executed.
 Rodriguez was originally convicted for having hired a hitman (Rolando Ruiz Jr.) to murder his wife in 1992. He was an alumnus of Central Catholic Marianist High School, and had taken teacher training classes at Southwest Texas State University (now Texas State University). Gary C. King of the Crime Library stated that he had a higher class background than Garcia.

Escape 

On December 13, 2000, the seven carried out an elaborate scheme and escaped from the John B. Connally Unit, a maximum-security state prison near the South Texas city of Kenedy.

At the time of the breakout, the reported ringleader of the Texas Seven, 30-year-old George Rivas, was serving 18 consecutive 15-to-life sentences. Michael Anthony Rodriguez, 38, was serving a 99-to-life term for contracting the murder of his wife by Rolando Ruiz Jr. (who was sentenced to death and subsequently executed in March 2017 for his involvement in the killing); while Larry James Harper, 37, Joseph Garcia, 29, and Patrick Henry Murphy Jr., 39, were all serving 50-year sentences. Donald Keith Newbury, 38, the member with the longest rap sheet in the group, was serving a 99-year sentence. Randy Halprin, 23, was serving a 30-year sentence for injury to a child, and was the youngest member.

Using several well-planned ploys, the seven convicts overpowered and restrained nine civilian maintenance supervisors, including their boss, four correctional officers, and three uninvolved inmates, at approximately 11:20. The escape occurred during lunch and at count time; the "slowest" period of the prison day, when there was less surveillance of certain locations, such as the maintenance area. Most of these plans involved one of the offenders calling someone over while another hit the unsuspecting person on the head from behind. Once each victim was knocked unconscious, the offenders removed some of his clothing, tied him up, gagged him, and placed him in an electrical room behind a locked door full of electronics, including warning alarms. The attackers stole clothing, credit cards, and identification from their victims. The group impersonated prison officers on the phone and created false stories to ward off suspicion from authorities.

After this first phase, three of the group made their way to the back gate of the prison, some disguised in stolen civilian clothing. They pretended to be there to install video monitors. One guard at the gatehouse was subdued, and the trio raided the guard tower and stole numerous weapons. Meanwhile, the four offenders who stayed behind called the prison tower guards to distract them. They then stole a prison maintenance pick-up truck, which they drove to the back gate of the prison, picked up their cohorts, and drove away from the prison.

Michael Rodriguez's father had provided the men a getaway car. For this act, he was convicted of a crime himself.

A Crime Library article about the seven compared the breakout to the June 1962 Alcatraz escape that occurred decades earlier.

Crime spree and Aubrey Hawkins 

The white prison truck was found in the Walmart parking lot in Kenedy, Texas. The Texas Seven first entered San Antonio right after breaking out of the complex. Realizing that they were running out of funds, they robbed a Radio Shack in Pearland, Texas, in Greater Houston, the following day.

On December 19, four of the members checked into an Econo Lodge motel in Farmers Branch, Texas, in the Dallas-Fort Worth area, under assumed names. They decided to rob an Oshman's Sporting Goods in nearby Irving. On December 24, 2000, they entered the store, bound and gagged all the staff, and stole at least 40 guns and sets of ammunition, including $70,000 from the store's safe. An ex-employee in her car outside the store noticed the commotion inside and called the police. Irving police officer Aubrey Wright Hawkins (February 23, 1971 – December 24, 2000) responded to the call and, upon arriving at the scene, was almost immediately ambushed, being shot 11 times and run over by the escaped convicts as they fled the scene. Hawkins died at Parkland Memorial Hospital in Dallas shortly after his arrival. Hawkins had been an officer with the Irving police department since October 4, 1995, and was married and had a son.

After Officer Hawkins' murder, a $100,000 reward was offered to whoever could snare the group of criminals. The reward climbed to $500,000 before the six surviving members of the group were apprehended.

Capture 

Following an episode of the television show America's Most Wanted that first aired on January 20, 2001, several people phoned in possible sightings of the suspects at the Coachlight Motel and R.V. Park in Woodland Park, Colorado. They had apparently tried to pass themselves off as missionaries, playing loud Christian music within earshot of their neighbours.

The El Paso County Sheriff's Office, Colorado, and Teller County Deputies SWAT team found Garcia, Rodriguez, and Rivas in a Jeep Cherokee in the RV Park, before following them to a nearby gas station where they were arrested, and later found Halprin and Harper in an RV; Halprin surrendered peacefully, but Harper was found dead after a standoff, having shot himself in the chest with a pistol. The surviving four were taken into federal custody.

On January 23, 2001, the FBI received information that the remaining two escapees, Newbury and Murphy, were hiding in a Holiday Inn in Colorado Springs, Colorado. A deal was brokered with the two, allowing them to make live TV appearances before they were arrested. Media was tipped off when a guest asked KKTV chief photographer Mike Petkash and reporter Jeannette Hinds why he couldn't get to the hotel. The pair drove to the hotel, finding it flooded with law enforcement. In the early hours of January 24, a local KKTV television anchorman, Eric Singer, was taken into the hotel where he interviewed the two by telephone while on camera. Newbury and Murphy harshly denounced the criminal justice system in Texas, with Newbury adding, "the system is as corrupt as we are."

Convictions and executions

In 2008, authorities indicted Patsy Gomez and Raul Rodriguez, the parents of Michael Rodriguez, for conspiring to help the Texas Seven.

George Rivas, the ringleader, was the first to be brought to trial; he was convicted and sentenced to death. Subsequently, the other five surviving members of the Texas Seven were brought to trial, convicted, and sentenced to death.

Rodriguez announced that he wished to forgo further appeal beyond the mandatory death-penalty appeal to the Texas Court of Criminal Appeals. A court-ordered psychiatric evaluation in January 2007 concluded that he was mentally competent to decide to forgo further appeals. Twenty months later, he became the first of the six surviving members to be executed on August 14, 2008, at 18:30. Rodriguez was TDCJ#999413, and his pre-death sentence TDCJ number was 698074.

George Rivas, TDCJ#999394, was executed almost four years later, on February 29, 2012, at 18:22.

Donald Newbury, TDCJ#999403, was executed by lethal injection on February 4, 2015, at 18:25.

Joseph Garcia, TDCJ#999441, was executed by lethal injection on December 4, 2018, at 18:43.

The remaining two members are incarcerated on death row at the Polunsky Unit of the Texas Department of Criminal Justice, located in West Livingston. Neither currently has an execution date.
 Halprin has the TDCJ number 00999453.
 Murphy has the TDCJ number 00999461.

Murphy was scheduled for execution twice, first on March 28, 2019. The United States Supreme Court granted him a last-minute reprieve on the basis that TDCJ's denial of his request to have a Buddhist priest in the execution room with him violated the Establishment Clause and Free Exercise Clause of the United States Constitution. Murphy was then given a second execution date, November 13, 2019. However, his execution was stayed by the United States District Court for the Southern District of Texas on November 7 to decide whether his religious discrimination lawsuit had merit.

Halprin was scheduled to be executed on October 10, 2019. However, his execution was stayed by the Texas Court of Criminal Appeals on October 4, 2019, due to concerns of racial and religious discrimination from his trial judge. Halprin is Jewish. Trial Judge Vickers "Vic" Cunningham allegedly referred to Halprin as a "kike" and a "fucking Jew" and said Jews "needed to be shut down because they controlled all the money."

The bodies of Harper, Rodriguez, Newbury, and Garcia are buried at Captain Joe Byrd Cemetery.

Hawkins's mother Jayne died of leukemia in 2007.

Media portrayals 

In 2001, the American Court TV (now TruTV) television series Mugshots released an episode covering Rivas, titled Mugshots - George Rivas.

In 2007, Wild Dream Films produced The Hunt For The Texas 7, a 90-minute feature documentary about the prison break. The film features interviews with members of The Texas 7 currently on Death Row and eyewitnesses to their crimes. The film was aired in late September 2008 on MSNBC.

On March 25, 2011, Investigation Discovery aired an episode about the case on the show FBI: Criminal Pursuit, subtitled "The Deadly Seven". One year later, on March 23, 2012, Investigation Discovery aired an episode of Werner Herzog's documentary series On Death Row, which dealt with Rivas and Garcia. The seven were also featured in an episode of Real Prison Breaks on ITV4 in the UK.

On July 30, 2014, Investigation Discovery's I (Almost) Got Away with It aired an episode titled "Got to Be Part of the Texas Seven."

Rivas had married a Canadian woman by proxy.

Halprin had also married by proxy.

On December 22 2017, Rapper Jay-Z released a music video for his song 'Legacy', in which the a dramatized version of events is depicted by several well known actors.

In Spring 2019, ITV UK produced the series: Death Row: Countdown To Execution hosted by Susanna Reid. Episode 1 chronicles the case of one of the members of Texas 7: Patrick Murphy. The series aired in the UK in June 2019.

See also 

 List of people executed in Texas, 2000–2009
 List of people executed in Texas, 2010–2019

References

External links 
 Timeline of Texas Prison Escape (Archive) - City of Irving
 Aubrey Hawkins (Archive) - City of Irving

2000 crimes in the United States
2000 murders in the United States
American people convicted of murder
Criminals from Texas
People executed by Texas by lethal injection
Quantified groups of defendants
Escapees from Texas detention
People convicted of murder by Texas
Murder in Texas
Murder–suicides in Texas
Gangs in Texas
Crimes in Texas
Suicides by firearm in Texas
Prison escapes